YULS or YUVsoft's Lossless Video Codec, a lossless video codec developed by YUVsoft, was designed to produce highly compressed lossless video. Compared with many lossless video codecs, YULS has the best compression ratio.

Releases

References 

Video codecs
Lossless compression algorithms